Evgeni Petrov (born 25 May 1978 in Ufa) is a Russian former professional road bicycle racer, who rode professionally between 2001 and 2016 for the , , , , , ,  and  teams. He won the 11th stage of the 2010 Giro d'Italia from Lucera to L'Aquila. He was ejected from the 2005 Tour de France and suspended from cycling for two weeks after his haemetocrit was deemed over the limit by morning controls on the tenth stage.

Major results

2000
 1st  Time trial, National Road Championships
 UCI Road World Under-23 Championships
1st  Road race
1st  Time trial
 1st  Time trial, European Under-23 Road Championships
 6th Trofeo Alcide Degasperi
 8th Overall Girobio
2001
 4th Joseph Vögeli Memorial
 6th Overall Bayern Rundfahrt
 6th Omloop Groot Oostende
 7th Overall Tour de l'Avenir
 8th Grand Prix des Nations
 9th Overall Tour de l'Ain
1st Stage 2a (ITT)
 9th Chrono des Herbiers
2002
 1st  Time trial, National Road Championships
 1st Overall Tour of Slovenia
1st Stage 4
 1st  Overall Tour de l'Avenir
 1st Duo Normand (with Filippo Pozzato)
 3rd Firenze–Pistoia
 4th Overall Circuit des Mines
 4th GP Winterthur
 6th Overall Bayern Rundfahrt
 9th Overall Tour of Austria
 9th ZLM Tour
 9th Chrono des Herbiers
2003
 1st Stage 2 (TTT) Vuelta a Castilla y León
 9th Grand Prix Eddy Merckx (with Vladimir Karpets)
 10th Overall Volta a Catalunya
2004
 5th Overall Vuelta a Murcia
 5th Overall Tour de Suisse
 9th Trofeo Città di Castelfidardo
2005
 2nd Overall Giro del Trentino
2006
 3rd Road race, National Road Championships
 5th Overall Deutschland Tour
 9th Coppa Ugo Agostoni
2007
 2nd Time trial, National Road Championships
 2nd Eindhoven Team Time Trial
 3rd Gran Premio di Lugano
 5th Overall Tour Méditerranéen
 5th Gran Premio di Chiasso
 7th Overall Giro d'Italia
 8th Overall Tirreno–Adriatico
2008
 10th Overall Giro del Trentino
2009
 10th Overall Critérium International
2010
 1st Stage 11 Giro d'Italia
 9th Overall Giro del Trentino
2014
 1st Stage 6 Tour of Austria

See also
 List of doping cases in cycling
List of sportspeople sanctioned for doping offences

References

External links

Living people
1978 births
Russian male cyclists
Olympic cyclists of Russia
Cyclists at the 2000 Summer Olympics
Cyclists at the 2004 Summer Olympics
Russian Giro d'Italia stage winners
Sportspeople from Ufa